Robert Feyerick (18 January 1892 – 18 June 1940) was a Belgian fencer. He competed in the individual and team sabre events at the 1920 and the 1924 Summer Olympics with the best result of fourth place in the team competition in 1920. His father Ferdinand was also an Olympic fencer.

He was killed in action during World War II.

References

External links
 

1892 births
1940 deaths
Belgian male sabre fencers
Olympic fencers of Belgium
Fencers at the 1920 Summer Olympics
Fencers at the 1924 Summer Olympics
Sportspeople from Ghent
Belgian military personnel killed in World War II